Blizonje is a village in the municipality of Valjevo, Serbia. According to the 2002 census, the village had a population of 281.

References

Populated places in Kolubara District